AppJet was a website that allowed users to create web-based applications in a client web browser. AppJet was founded by three MIT graduates, two of whom were engineers at Google before starting AppJet. They launched their initial public beta on December 12, 2007, allowing anyone to create a web app.

AppJet received funding from Y Combinator in the summer of 2007.

The project closed on July 1, 2009 to focus attention on the EtherPad.

AppJet was acquired by Google on December 4, 2009, for an undisclosed amount.

JGate is a free, cloud-based service, in beta, that can be used to run AppJet applications.

Programming tutorial

On August 14, 2008, AppJet released a programming tutorial aimed at a target audience of "absolute beginners". 

The tutorial used the AppJet IDE to provide a programming sandbox for examples, allowing readers to experiment with sample code. This was one of the first online tutorials to embed an IDE, exposing a complete server-side web app framework inline with text.

Web software framework

"AppJet" also refers to the server-side JavaScript framework that powers AppJet applications. This is an example of a recent trend in web development, to run JavaScript on both the client and the server, allowing developers to code entire web apps in one language, instead of using a separate language for server-side and client-side scripting.

The virtual machine that powers AppJet apps is based on the Java Virtual Machine, using the Rhino Javascript implementation. Scala libraries are also used.

Features
Free app hosting (discontinued)
Persistent storage (up to 50 Mebibyte, MiB)
Online IDE
Custom domains
Forum

Updates
AppJet is often updated with bug-fixes, improvements, and other features. A major update to the site was a  graphical change implemented on July 10, 2008. This update also added the feature to "Comment" on users apps. Comments are messages about apps left at the URL comments.appname.appjet.net.

Another update occurred on May 2, 2008. This update allowed apps to be hosted at custom domains.

References

External links
AppJet
TechCrunch
Ajaxian

Web software
Discontinued Google acquisitions